is a 1941 black-and-white Japanese drama film written and directed by Kajirō Yamamoto and starring Hideko Takamine. It is now best known for being the last film that Akira Kurosawa worked on before starting his own directorial career.

Plot
A young girl named Ine from a poor village family wants nothing more than to own a horse. Her family soon takes in a pregnant mare which they have signed on to care for over the winter. Financial troubles push the family towards the edge of ruin and neither they nor the horse have much to eat. The horse becomes very ill and the vet determines only grass will save it. Ine walks many miles through the snow to a hot spring where grass grows year-round and saves the horse's life. That spring gives birth to a colt and it looks as if Ine will finally have her horse. But when the colt is grown, the government orders it auctioned and sold to the army, as unpaid bills force the family to sell the colt. Ine takes a job in a mill to save money to buy her horse back. On the day of the auction, she is outbid and cries as the horse is led away for the last time.

Cast
 Hideko Takamine – Ine Onoda
 Kamatari Fujiwara – Jinjiro Onoda, Ine's father
 Chieko Takehisa – Saku Onoda, Ine's mother
 Kaoru Futaba – Ei, Ine's grandmother
 Takeshi Hirata – Toyokazu Onoda, Ine's older brother
 Toshio Hosoi – Kinjiro Onoda, Ine's younger brother
 Setsuko Ichikawa – Tsuru Onoda, Ine's little sister
 Sadao Maruyama – Mr. Yamashita, the teacher
 Sadako Sawamura – Kikuko Yamashita, the teacher's wife
 Sōji Kiyokawa – Mr. Sakamoto

Production
Horse was written and directed by Kajirō Yamamoto. Akira Kurosawa is credited as the film's production coordinator, but in his autobiography, Something Like an Autobiography, Kurosawa likened his actual role to "first assistant director". It is the last film Kurosawa worked on as an assistant before starting his own directing career. The film took three years to plan and a year to film. Yamamoto later stated in an interview that his then-assistant Kurosawa "took responsibility for second unit work" while Yamamoto worked on a musical comedy in Tokyo. Kurosawa wrote in his autobiography that he, in addition to his position as first assistant and second unit director, co-scripted and edited the film. The final shot of Uma has been compared to the final shot of Kurosawa's second film, The Most Beautiful, which also emphasizes the personal sacrifice of a young woman during wartime.

References

External links
 
 

Japanese black-and-white films
1941 films
Films directed by Akira Kurosawa
Films directed by Kajiro Yamamoto
Films with screenplays by Akira Kurosawa
Japanese drama films
1941 drama films